Koronis Rift is a 1985 computer game from Lucasfilm Games.  It was produced and designed by Noah Falstein. Originally developed for the Atari 8-bit family and the Commodore 64, Koronis Rift was ported to the Amstrad CPC, Apple II, MSX, Tandy Color Computer 3, and ZX Spectrum.

The Atari and C64 version shipped on a flippy disk, with one version of the game on each side. A cassette version was also released for the Commodore 64.  The Atari version required computers with the GTIA chip installed in order to display properly.

Koronis Rift was one of two games in Lucasfilm Games' second wave (December 1985). The other was The Eidolon. Both enhanced the fractal technology developed for Rescue on Fractalus!. In Koronis Rift, the Atari 8-bit family's additional colors (over those of the Commodore 64) allowed the programmers to gradually fade in the background rather than it suddenly popping in as in Rescue, an early example of depth cueing in a computer game.

Gameplay

The player controls a surface rover vehicle to enter several "rifts" on an alien planet which are effectively fractal mazes. A lost civilisation known as the Ancients has left strange machinery, so-called "hulks", within these rifts which are guarded by armed flying saucers of different design and color. Depending on their respective color, shields and gunshots of both the rover and the saucers are of varying effectiveness against each other; part of the game is figuring out which shield and weapon modules work best where.

By means of a drone robot, the rover can retrieve modules with various functions (which are not immediately obvious) from nearby hulks. It can only be deployed when all attacking Guardian Saucers have been destroyed. The modules can then be installed in the rover, analyzed aboard the player's space ship, or sold; the rover can carry up to six different modules at a time which can be activated and de-activated as the player sees fit. A large variety of modules is available: Different weapon and shield modules with varying power levels and color codes, modules that increase the rover's power output, a mapper (activating an extra screen on the rover), and even one module that turns the retrieval probe into a bomb, destroying any hulks the probe is sent to investigate instead of retrieving modules.

Conversely, different types of hulks exist including one that simply "swallows" the probe without yielding a module, requiring the player to purchase a new probe (and possibly sell useful modules to raise the required funds).

The goal of the game is to find and destroy the saucer control base hulk which is located in the 20th rift. To this end, the player must explore the rifts, find hulks, retrieve and analyze modules and understand the color-coding of weapons and shields to overcome the increasingly aggressive and dangerous saucers. The game can be solved in several ways; the quickest is to acquire the bomb module and send the probe into the saucer base with the bomb module activated.

Reception
Info rated Koronis Rift four stars out of five, stating that it was the best of Epyx's four Lucasfilm games. Computer Gaming World stated that "if KR is a game, it is also a puzzle ... arcade skill alone isn't enough". The reviewer did not enjoy the game because it was so difficult that he spent too much time savescumming, but praised the graphics and sound. Zzap!64 thought that the game was an improvement on its predecessor, Rescue on Fractalus, with superior graphics and gameplay. It was given an overall rating of 96%.

References

External links
 Koronis Rift at Atari Mania
 Koronis Rift at Gamebase 64
 
 Koronis Rift manual at C64Sets.com
 LucasArts' 20th anniversary retrospective

1985 video games
Action-adventure games
Activision games
Amstrad CPC games
Apple II games
Atari 8-bit family games
Commodore 64 games
Epyx games
LucasArts games
MSX games
Science fiction video games
Tank simulation video games
TRS-80 Color Computer games
Video games set on fictional planets
ZX Spectrum games
Video games developed in the United States
Single-player video games